Elisha Brown (25 May 1717 – 20 April 1802) was a deputy governor of the Colony of Rhode Island and Providence Plantations. He was the son of James and Mary (Harris) Brown, and the great grandson of early Rhode Island settler and Baptist minister Chad Brown.  Brown was a member of the General Assembly, and possessed a large property, which was lost during the financial difficulties of the mid-18th century. During the Ward-Hopkins controversy, he sided with Samuel Ward, and during Ward's term as governor from 1765 to 1767, Brown was selected as his deputy governor.

Later in life, Brown moved to Wenscutt, located in North Providence, Rhode Island, and became a member of the Society of Friends.  He had first married Martha, the daughter of John and Deborah (Angell) Smith, and a great granddaughter of both colonial president Gregory Dexter as well as Roger Williams' associate Thomas Angell.  Following her death, he married Hannah Cushing, the widow of Elijah Cushing, and the daughter of James Barker.

He was the uncle of wealthy businessman John Brown and anti-slavery activist Moses Brown.

Ancestry 

Most of Brown's known ancestry is found in Austin's Genealogical Dictionary of Rhode Island.

See also

 List of lieutenant governors of Rhode Island
 List of colonial governors of Rhode Island
 Colony of Rhode Island and Providence Plantations

References

Bibliography

Further reading

External links
State list of lieutenant governors of Rhode Island

1717 births
1802 deaths
Politicians from Providence, Rhode Island
People of colonial Rhode Island
Elisha Brown